RMAF Kuala Lumpur  was an air base in Kuala Lumpur. It is also known as Sungai Besi Air Base, Simpang Airport, Old Airport.

History
It served as the main airport for Kuala Lumpur from 1952 to 1965 under the name Kuala Lumpur International Airport, until the main airport was moved to Subang International Airport. It was the first airport to serve Kuala Lumpur and currently remains as the only airport to be located within the boundaries of Kuala Lumpur Federal Territory.

Formerly known as RAF Kuala Lumpur, it was used by the Royal Malaysian Air Force, Royal Malaysian Police Air Wing Unit and the air unit of the Malaysian Fire and Rescue Department.

The Royal Selangor Flying Club also flies from Simpang Airport. The four Cessna 172N Skyhawk aircraft belonging to the club are based at this airport.

The airport was supposed to be demolished to make way for a housing estate, but that plan was cancelled and the airport is still used for air force flights. There had been non-fatal accidents before, involving single engine airplanes, at the surrounding roads and flyovers which are usually very busy during rush hours.

The airport also housed the RMAF Museum, which was the only aviation museum in Malaysia but ceased operation for the construction of the Bandar Malaysia North station. There was no entrance fee and there a total of 18 aircraft at the museum, including a de Havilland Tiger Moth and one of the few surviving Scottish Aviation Twin Pioneers. Some of the aircraft were accessible, like the de Havilland Dove.

The airport has ceased operation on 16 March 2018. The air base will be relocated to Sendayan in Negeri Sembilan.

See also

 Royal Malaysian Air Force bases
 List of airports in Malaysia

References

Defunct airports in Malaysia
Buildings and structures in Kuala Lumpur
Military airbases established in 1952
Airports established in 1952
Airports disestablished in 1965
Airports disestablished in 2018
1952 establishments in Malaya
Military installations of Malaysia